This is the discography page for Darren Styles. It also includes the discography of his groups DJ Force & The Evolution, Force & Styles and Styles & Breeze. It also includes the peak chart performance of each album or single where applicable.

Albums

Studio albums

Compilation albums
 Simply Electric (1998) (DJ Force & The Evolution / Force & Styles)
 Heart of Gold (2000) (Force & Styles)

Extended plays
 Jelly Baby 1 (2002)
 Hixxy & Styles (2006)
 Darren Styles (2006)
 Darren Styles & Gammer (2014)

DJ mix albums
 Inside the Mind of Force & Styles (1997)
 Moondance: The Album (1997)
 The Sound of Happycore '97 Volume 2 (1997)
 United Dance Volume 6 (1997)
 Explosion '97 (1997)
 Masters @ Work Volume II (1998)
 The Best of United Dance (1998)
 Dance Energy (1998)
 Hardcore Heaven: The Battle of Britain (1999)
 Masters of Hardcore (2002)
 Hardcore Heaven 2: Reloaded (2003)
 Hardcore Til I Die (2003)
 Original Hardcore 2: The Battle (2003)
 Battle of the DJ's: Match 2 (2004)
 Original Hardcore: The Nu Breed (2004)
 Bonkers 12 - The Dirty Dozen (2004)
 Ultimate NRG & Hardcore, Vol. 2 (2005)
 Clubland X-Treme Hardcore (2005)
 Clubland X-Treme Hardcore 2 (2006)
 Clubland X-Treme Hardcore 3 (2006)
 Clubland X-Treme Hardcore 4 (2007)
 Clubland X-Treme Hardcore 5 (2008)
 Clubland X-Treme Hardcore 6 (2009)
 Clubland X-Treme Hardcore 7 (2010)
 Clubland X-Treme Hardcore 8 (2012)
 Clubland X-Treme Hardcore 9 (2013)

Singles

List of singles

Charted singles

DJ Force & The Evolution
DJ Force & The Evolution
1993 "Fall Down On Me"
1993 "Raining Smiles"
1993 "Poltergeist"
1993 "Twelve Midnight"
1993 "Perfect Dreams"
1994 "High on Life"
1995 "Show Me Heaven"
1995 "Simply Electric"

A Sense of Summer
1995 "Around the World"
1995 "On Top"

Force & Styles
Force & Styles
1995 "All Over"
1995 "Harmony"
1996 "Down 2 Love"
1996 "Fun Fair"
1996 "Heart of Gold" (featuring Jenna)
1996 "Shining Down" (featuring Jenna)
1996 "Wonderland" (featuring Jenna)
1996 "Your Love (Get Down)"
1997 "Field of Dreams"
1997 "Follow Me"
1997 "Pacific Sun" (featuring Junior)
1997 "Paradise & Dreams" (featuring Junior)
1997 "Pretty Green Eyes" (featuring Junior)
1997 "Simply Electric"
1997 "United in Dance"
1998 "Cutting Deep" (featuring Junior)
1998 "Heart of Gold '98" (featuring Kelly Llorenna)
2001 "Field of Dreams" (featuring Jenna)
2001 "Look at Me Now" (featuring Junior)
2001 "Make Believe" (featuring Lisa Abbott)
2001 "Pretty Green Eyes" (featuring Junior)

Styles & Breeze
Breeze and Styles
2002 "Future Set"
2002 "You're Shining"
2003 "The Beat Kicks/2 the Dancefloor"
2004 "Heart Beats/Electric"

Futureworld
2002 "Chemical Love"

Styles and Breeze
2002 "All I Want"/"Don't Want You"
2002 "Black Magic, Bad Magic"/"Oxygen"
2002 "Overdrive"/"Energise"
2003 "Home (At Last)"/"Rainbow"
2003 "Sonic"/"Total XTC"
2004 "Heartbeatz"
2004 "You're Shining"
2005 Heartbeats (Remixes)
2005 "You're My Angel"
2006 "I Will Be"
2006 "Slide Away"
Unreleased Come With Me

Darren Styles and Mark Breeze presents Infexious
2003 "Let Me Fly"
2010 "Won't Forget These Days"
Infextious
2003 "Let Me Fly"
2009 "Amigos"
2010 "Won't Forget These Days"

As solo artist
Unique
1998 Feelin' Fine
1998 Higher Ground
1998 5am
1998 Distant Skies

Darren Styles
2002 Black Magic
2002 Sirens
2004 Back 2 The Old School
2005 Cutting Deep
2006 Getting Better
2006 Save Me
2006 Jealous
2006 Skydivin
2007 Feel Love
2007 Flashlight
2007 Girlfriend
2007 Feel Love
2008 Come Running
2010 Sound Without A Name
2010 Holding On
2014 Talk
2017 Feel Like This (with Gammer)
2017 Us Against The World
2017 Party Don't Stop (with Dougal and Gammer)
2018 Sky is Falling (with Stonebank featuring Emel)
2018 Long Way Down (with W&W featuring Giin)
2018 Home (with Dougal featuring Jacob Wellfair)
2018 Crash and Burn (with Tweekacore featuring Giin)
2018 Home (with Dougal featuring Jacob Wellfair)
2019 Never Let Me Down (featuring David Spekter)
2020 DLMD (with TNT)
2020 DYSYLM (with Gammer)
2020 Neon Hearts (featuring PollyAnna)
2020 Skank in the Rave (with Stonebank)
2021 Dance Again (with Timmy Trumpet and Azteck)
2021 Superhorn (with Gammer)
2022 Forever (with Olly James and Dee Dee)

Styles
2002 Over and Over

Hixxy and Styles
2005 Rushins / The Theme #143

Ultrabeat vs Darren Styles
2007 Sure Feels Good
2008 Discolights

Darren Styles & N-Force
2008 Right by Your Side

Zero Hero (Stonebank and Darren Styles) 

Rocket League songs as part of Zero Hero
 "Twilight" (2017)

Music videos

References

Discographies of British artists
Electronic music discographies